Johannes "Hans" van de Haar (born February 1, 1975) is a Dutch football manager and former player. He currently manages Tweede Divisie club TEC

Professional career

Netherlands, Austria & Germany
Van de Haar was born in Amersfoort. He played in the Dutch, German and Austrian football leagues, having played with HFC Haarlem, De Graafschap, KFC Uerdingen 05, SSV Ulm 1846, SW Bregenz, FC Utrecht and RKC Waalwijk, ADO Den Haag and AGOVV Apeldoorn. He won the KNVB Cup once with Utrecht in 2004, and subsequently played in the UEFA Cup.

United States
In May 2010, van de Haar signed a two and a half year contract to play for the new American team Dayton Dutch Lions in the USL Premier Development League. Van de Haar made his first appearance for the Dutch Lions on May 15, 2010 against the Cleveland Internationals, and scored his team's second goal in a 3–0 victory.

He returned to the Netherlands to play for SV Spakenburg following the conclusion of the 2010 PDL season in August.

Managerial career
In the summer of 2013, Van de Haar became manager of Topklasse side FC Lienden. In 2016, he moved to SV Spakenburg to become the head coach of the team in the newly formed Tweede Divisie, where he was a fired on January 7, 2017. On May 8, 2018 he was added to FC Lienden's staff for the remainder of the 2017–2018 season.  He was also an assistant-coach at FC Utrecht.

In February 2020, it was announced that Van de Haar left would leave Lienden after the 2019–20 season, to join Tweede Divisie club TEC as their new manager.

Honours
Utrecht
KNVB Cup: 2003–04

References

External links
 
 ADO Den Haag Profile and Eredivisie Stats 

Living people
1975 births
Sportspeople from Amersfoort
Association football forwards
2. Bundesliga players
ADO Den Haag players
AGOVV Apeldoorn players
Bundesliga players
Van De Haar, Hans
De Graafschap players
Dutch expatriate footballers
Dutch footballers
Eerste Divisie players
Eredivisie players
Expatriate footballers in Austria
Expatriate footballers in Germany
Van De Haar, Hans
Dutch expatriate sportspeople in Austria
Dutch expatriate sportspeople in Germany
Dutch expatriate sportspeople in the United States
FC Utrecht players
HFC Haarlem players
KFC Uerdingen 05 players
Van De Haar, Hans
RKC Waalwijk players
SSV Ulm 1846 players
SW Bregenz players
FC Lienden managers
Dutch football managers
SV Spakenburg managers
SV TEC managers
Footballers from Utrecht (province)